Anthony Bert Camazzola (born September 11, 1962, in Burnaby, British Columbia) is a Canadian retired ice hockey defenceman who played three games in the National Hockey League. He was originally drafted in 1980 by the Washington Capitals.

His brother, Jim Camazzola, also played in the NHL and in Europe.

References

External links

Profile at hockeysdraftcentral.com

1962 births
Living people
Bellingham Blazers players
Brandon Wheat Kings players
Canadian ice hockey defencemen
Canadian sportspeople of Italian descent
Fort Wayne Komets players
Hershey Bears players
Sportspeople from Burnaby
Toledo Goaldiggers players
Washington Capitals draft picks
Washington Capitals players
Ice hockey people from British Columbia